Janne Salli (born 14 December 1977) is a Finnish retired footballer.

Salli captained the Finnish Under-21 team while playing for FC Haka.

Salli then moved to Barnsley in the English leagues, but suffered a knee injury against Leeds United which he could not recover from, and the English papers of the time reported he had retired at the age of 24.

References

External links 
 Injury-hit Salli returns 
 Janne Salli kerännyt kehuja Englannissa 
 Janne Salli tyytyväinen alkuunsa Barnsleyssa  
 Janne Salli pysyy Barnsleyn avauksessa 
 Janne Salli saapui Barnsleyyn 
 Janne Salli palasi Barnsley’n harjoituksiin
 Janne Salli palaa maajoukkuepaitaan
 Salli forced to retire 
 Nivunen vaivaa Janne Sallia 
 MTVuutiset.fi Tag 
 Matkan varrelta 7. – Salli 
 Veikkausliiga Profile
 at National-Football-Teams 
 at Soccerway

Finnish footballers
Finnish expatriate footballers
Finland international footballers
Expatriate footballers in England
Association football defenders
Tampereen Pallo-Veikot players
Barnsley F.C. players
FC Haka players
FC Ilves players
TP-Seinäjoki players
1977 births
Living people